The following highways are numbered 837:

Ireland
  R837 regional road

United States